Tomás Añorbe y Corregel (Madrid, 1686 - id, 1741) was a priest, playwright and poet Spanish.

Biography
Chaplain of the Royal Convent of the Incarnation, spent his life busy in charity missions, an activity that he combined with the cultivation of poetry ( Bitterness of death and Christian thoughts , 1731) and, above all , of the theater, an area in which it constitutes a fundamental link within the late-Baroque theater, under which it is placed next to playwrights such as José de Cañizares and Antonio de Zamora. Within the popular theater of the late seventeenth and early eighteenth centuries, he delved into the genres most acclaimed by the public at that time: comedy of saints, or more specifically, of sinful saints, with  Princess, harlot and martyr, Santa Afra  (1735), a piece that, like others of Vicente Camacho ( Harlot of Phenicia and happy Samaritan woman, Santa Eudoxia  (1740) and Andrés Antonio Sánchez de Villamayor ( The strong woman, astonishment of the deserts, penitent and admirable Santa María Egipcíaca , 1728), attended more to the spectacular and, consequently, to the conscious deformation of the pious stories, than to matters of devotion, which sparked the censorship of the moralists, among them Gaspar Díaz in his famous Theological Consultation.  In the field of mythological zarzuela, a spectacular genre par excellence in which the various eighteenth-century mills made free use of the classical references by virtue of comedy, Añorbe and Co Rregel tempted his chords in Jupiter and Dánae, a piece where the myth classic is spiced up with numerous anachronisms and characters outside him, such as the funny Mamurrias. But, without a doubt, his best-known work is the tragedy El Paulino (1740), imitation of the Cinna of Pierre Corneille, even though the cover page appears pompously "new tragedy to French fashion, with all the rigor of art." The dramatic production of Añorbe is completed with some short pieces, such as the Entremés del Mudo, 1734, or Second Sainete, or The Matter of Casting Ladies and Galants (1734) and a good bouquet of comedies ( Lovers of Salerno, 1739;  Nullities of love , 1734, and  La Segismunda , 1739) among others.

Bibliography 
Javier Huerta, Emilio Peral, Héctor Urzaiz, Teatro español de la A a la Z. Madrid: Espasa-Calpe, 2005. ("Javier Huerta, Emilio Peral, Héctor Urzaiz, `` Spanish Theater from A to Z ''. Madrid: Espasa-Calpe, 2005.")

1686 births
1741 deaths
Writers from Madrid
Spanish dramatists and playwrights
Spanish male dramatists and playwrights
18th-century Spanish poets
18th-century Spanish writers
Spanish male poets
18th-century male writers
18th-century Spanish dramatists and playwrights